In mathematics, a subset of a given set is closed under an operation of the larger set if performing that operation on members of the subset always produces a member of that subset. For example, the natural numbers are closed under addition, but not under subtraction:  is not a natural number, although both 1 and 2 are. 

Similarly, a subset is said to be closed under a collection of operations if it is closed under each of the operations individually.

The closure of a subset is the result of a closure operator applied to the subset. The closure of a subset under some operations is the smallest superset that is closed under these operations. It is often called the span (for example linear span) or the generated set.

Definitions

The main property of closed sets, which results immediately from the definition, is that every intersection of closed sets is a closed set.

The concepts of closed sets and closure are often extended to any property of subsets that are stable under intersection; that is, every intersection of subsets that have the property has also the property. For example, in  a Zariski-closed set, also known as an algebraic set, is the set of the common zeros of a family of polynomials, and the Zariski closure of a set  of points is the smallest algebraic set that contains .

In algebraic structures
An algebraic structure is a set equipped with operations that satisfy some axioms. These axioms may be identities. Some axioms may contain existential quantifiers  in this case it is worth to add some auxiliary operations in order that all axioms become identities or purely universally quantified formulas. See Algebraic structure for details.

It follows that, in a specific example, when closeness is proved, there is no need to check the axioms for proving that a substructure is a structure of the same type.

For example, a group is a set with an associative operation, often called multiplication, with an identity element, such that every element has an inverse element. Here, the auxiliary operations are the nullary operation that results in the identity element and the unary operation of inversion. A subset of a group that is closed under multiplication and inversion is also closed under the nullary operation (that is, it contains the identity) if and only if it is non-empty. So, a non-empty subset of a group that is closed under multiplication and inversion is a group that is called a subgroup. The subgroup generated by a single element, that is, the closure of this element, is called a cyclic group.

In linear algebra, the closure of a non-empty subset of a vector space (under vector-space operations, that is, addition and scalar multiplication) is the linear span of this subset. It is a vector space by the preceding general result, and it can be proved easily that is the set of linear combinations of elements of the subset.

Similar examples can be given for almost every algebraic structures, with, sometimes some specific terminology. For example, in a commutative ring, the closure of a single element under ideal operations is called a principal ideal.

In topology

In topology and related branches, the relevant operation is taking limits.  The topological closure of a set is the corresponding closure operator.  The Kuratowski closure axioms characterize this operator.

Binary relations
The notation  is commonly used for  Many properties or operations on relations can be used to define closures. Some of the most common ones follow:

Reflexivity 
A relation  on the set  is reflexive if  for every  As every intersection of reflexive relations is reflexive, this defines a closure. The reflexive closure of a relation  is thus 
Symmetry
Symmetry is the unary operation on  that maps  to  A relation is symmetric if it is closed under this operation, and the symmetric closure of a relation  is its closure under this relation.
Transitivity

A preorder is a relation that is reflective and transitive. It follows that the reflexive transitive closure of a relation is the smallest preorder containing it. Similarly, the reflexive transitive symmetric closure or equivalence closure of a relation is the smallest equivalence relation that contains it.

Other examples
 In matroid theory, the closure of X is the largest superset of X that has the same rank as X.
 The transitive closure of a set.
 The algebraic closure of a field.
 The integral closure of an integral domain in a field that contains it.
 The radical of an ideal in a commutative ring.
 In geometry, the convex hull of a set S of points is the smallest convex set of which S is a subset.
 In formal languages, the Kleene closure of a language can be described as the set of strings that can be made by concatenating zero or more strings from that language.
 In group theory, the conjugate closure or normal closure of a set of group elements is the smallest normal subgroup containing the set.
 In mathematical analysis and in probability theory, the closure of a collection of subsets of X under countably many set operations is called the σ-algebra generated by the collection.

Closure operator

In the preceding sections, closures are considered for subsets of a given set. The subsets of a set form a partially ordered set (poset) for inclusion. Closure operators allow generalizing the concept of closure to any partially ordered set.

Closure operator vs. closed sets
A closure on the subsets of a given set may be defined either by a closure operator or by a set of closed sets that is stable under intersection and includes the given set. These two definitions are equivalent. 

Indeed, the defining properties of a closure operator  implies that an intersection of closed sets is closed: if  is an intersection of closed sets, then  must contain  and be contained in every  This implies  by definition of the intersection.

Conversely, if closed sets are given and every intersection of closed sets is closed, then one can define a closure operator  such that  is the intersection of the closed sets containing .

This equivalence remains true for partially ordered sets with the greatest-lower-bound property, if one replace "closed sets" by "closed elements" and "intersection" by "greatest lower bound".

Notes

References

 

Set theory
Closure operators
Abstract algebra